John W. Harris is an Australian Bible translator and linguist known for his works on aboriginal Christianity and creoles.
He is one of the first scholars who provided a detailed account of Australian creoles.
In 1986, he was Senior Lecturer in Education at Darwin Institute of Technology.
He received a Lambeth Degree from the Archbishop of Canterbury in 2010.

Books
 1986. Northern Territory pidgins and the origin of Kriol. Canberra: Pacific Linguistics
 1994, One Blood: 200 Years Of Aboriginal Encounter With Christianity (revised edition), Albatross Books, Sydney.
 1998, We wish we’d done more: ninety years of CMS and Aboriginal issues in north Australia, Openbook, Adelaide.

References

External links
On a Mission: The Institutionalising of Aboriginal Children
NORTHERN TERRITORY PIDGINS AND THE ORIGIN OF KRIOL
Hiding the bodies: the myth of the humane colonisation of Aboriginal Australia
CONTACT LANGUAGES AT THE NORTHERN TERRITORY BRITISH MILITARY SETTLEMENTS 1824-1849
1998 Mission Australia Address by Dr John W Harris

Living people
University of Queensland alumni
Linguists from Australia
Australian anthropologists
Bible translators
Australian biblical scholars
Linguists of pidgins and creoles
Historians of Christianity
Year of birth missing (living people)